Thomas Baskerville Mynors Baskerville (9 April 1790 – 9 September 1864) was a British Conservative politician.

Baskerville was elected Conservative Member of Parliament for Herefordshire at the 1841 general election and held the seat until 1847 when he did not seek re-election.

References

External links
 

UK MPs 1841–1847
Conservative Party (UK) MPs for English constituencies
1790 births
1864 deaths